The International Max Planck Research School for Organismal Biology was a structured doctoral program of the former Max Planck Institute for Ornithology in Seewiesen (Pöcking) (now  MPI for Biological Intelligence)  and Radolfzell (now MPI of Animal Behaviour) and the department of Biology of the University of Konstanz. Its goal was to provide training and education to PhD students from all over the world in a stimulating work environment. Research focused on behavioral science, ecology, evolutionary biology, physiology and neurobiology. The IMPRS for Organismal Biology was founded in 2009. In October 2010, the first 30 doctoral students began their research. The faculty consisted of more than 30 leading scientists from the former Max Planck Institute for Ornithology and the Department of Biology at the University of Konstanz.

The school ended in 2023. In Seewiesen structured doctoral training is now being continued by the IMPRS - Biological Intelligence and in Radolfzell by the IMPRS for Quantitative Behaviour, Ecology & Evolution.

References

External links 
 Homepage of the IMPRS for Organismal Biology
 Homepage of the MPI for Biological Intelligence
 Homepage of the MPI of Animal Behavior
 Homepage of the Biology department of the University of Konstanz

Max Planck Society
University of Konstanz